"Let Me Ride" is a song by rapper and producer Dr. Dre, released in 1993 as the third single from his debut studio album, The Chronic. It experienced moderate success on the charts, until it became a massive hit when Dre won a Grammy Award for Best Rap Solo Performance for the song during the Grammy Awards of 1994. The chorus is sung by Ruben and Jewell, and Snoop Dogg (then known as Snoop Doggy Dogg) raps the line "Rollin' in my 6-4" and appears in some background vocals.

Dr. Dre's lyrics were written by RBX, originally intended for a different track. Dr. Dre, RBX and Snoop Dogg share songwriting credits for the song.

"Let Me Ride"'s chorus involves both a sample and an interpolation of the chorus of the 1976 Parliament song "Mothership Connection (Star Child)", which itself quotes the Negro spiritual "Swing Down Sweet Chariot". "Let Me Ride" also samples James Brown's "Funky Drummer" and Bill Withers's 1973 single "Kissing My Love".

Hip Hop Dx placed the song on their list of 13 Great Hip Hop Songs For The Summer.

Music video
The music video was shot on location at Slauson Avenue in Los Angeles and was directed by Dr. Dre. It is the second lowrider cult video of Dre's cinematographer "walk of life" that was nominated for a MTV Video Music Award for Best Rap Video in the same year. The video begins with Dre, in his home watching the $20 Sack Pyramid (a track skit from the album shown as a game show in the video), taking a phone call and being invited to a Parliament concert. He then heads out in his lowrider and the song begins. Many helicopter-view camshots of the super-highways of Compton follow, some cuts of Snoop, a car-jacking scene, and various footage of Dre picking up girls, all of which leads to a street party outside the concert venue. Ice Cube makes a cameo appearance, walking out from a women's bathroom saying "Damn right, it was a good day", referring to his 1992 solo single, and also officially squashing the beef between Dre and Ice Cube which had existed since Ice Cube left N.W.A. It has been proposed that Danny Partridge may have cameos in the video, though the rumors were never confirmed.

The final shots of the video feature footage from Parliament-Funkadelic's 1976 earth tour, including the Starchild flying on wires with the bop gun, the band singing "Mothership Connection", which "Let Me Ride" samples, and concludes with George Clinton departing into the Mothership with a plume of smoke, upon which Dre's face is superimposed.

Rapper Warren G (Dre's step-brother) makes a cameo appearance, along with rappers The D.O.C. and The Lady of Rage Producer Bonita "Bo" Money, and actress Jada Pinkett-Smith.

The video features a Chevy 1964 Impala, which would be used in many other Dr. Dre and Snoop Dogg videos.

Remixes
An official remix of the song features full verses from Snoop Dogg and Daz, and an appearance by George Clinton. It was recorded simultaneously with the original version and was released on the 12-inch vinyl when the solo version was chosen to be a part of the album. The full version of the remix is 11 minutes long and features a guitar solo by Johnny "Guitar" Watson. The beat was later remade as a G-Funk remix and the instrumental was used for the Up In Smoke Tour in 2000. Dr. Dre also produced the beat for the remix.

References in popular culture
Nate Dogg refers to "Let Me Ride" in Warren G's 1994 song "Regulate", in which he sings, "She said 'my car's broke down and you seem real nice, would ya let me ride?'"

Rapper Fabolous, in his 2001 hit "Can't Deny It", had the lyric "bitches be yellin "let me ride", like I'm Snoop, and Dr. Dre." Rapper The Game similarly refers to "Let Me Ride" in his 2005 song "Put You on the Game", where he claims to be in a car with Dre in the back and "bitches screaming, 'Let me ride!'"

Track listing
 CD single
 "Let Me Ride" (Radio Mix) - 4:22
 "Let Me Ride" (Extended Club Mix) - 11:01
 "One Eight Seven" - 4:18

 12" vinyl
 "Let Me Ride" (Extended Club Mix) - 11:01
 "Let Me Ride" (Radio Mix) - 4:22
 "One Eight Seven" - 4:18

 US 12" vinyl
 "Let Me Ride" (Extended Club Mix) - 11:01
 "Let Me Ride" (Radio Mix) - 4:22
 "Let Me Ride" (LP Version) - 4:47

 Cassette single
 "Let Me Ride" (Radio Mix) - 4:22
 "Let Me Ride" (Extended Club Mix) - 11:01

Charts

Awards and nominations

External links 
 http://www.discogs.com/Dr-Dre-Let-Me-Ride/release/955595

References

1992 songs
1994 singles
Dr. Dre songs
Grammy Award for Best Rap Solo Performance
Song recordings produced by Dr. Dre
Songs written by Dr. Dre
Songs written by Snoop Dogg
Death Row Records singles
Interscope Records singles